Anthony Leonard Harris (born 1935) is a British geologist and former president of the Geological Society of London.

References

British geologists
1935 births
Living people
Place of birth missing (living people)